The Loire-Nieuport 10 was a 1930s French prototype  long-range maritime reconnaissance and combat floatplane produced by Loire-Nieuport, a joint venture between Loire Aviation and Nieuport-Delage. It was an attempt to answer the requirements for the Navy's programme Hydravion éclaireur de combat ("Combat reconnaissance seaplane") for a large floatplane capable of acting as a torpedo bomber or reconnaissance aircraft.

Development and design
Design of the Loire-Nieuport 10 started in 1937, with the resultant aircraft being a twin-engined monoplane of all-metal stressed-skin construction with inverted gull (or W-shaped) wings.  It was powered by two Gnome-Rhône 14N  radial engines mounted above the wings, with the twin large floats on pylons under the wing, directly beneath the engines.  The deep fuselage accommodated a crew of six, with pilot and co-pilot seated in tandem, while a glazed nose was provided for the bomb-aimer/navigator.  Defensive armament was a machine gun in the nose, with another firing through a ventral hatch, and a 20 mm cannon in a dorsal turret, while it could carry two torpedoes or 1,200 kg (2,700 lb) of bombs in an internal bomb-bay.

The prototype Loire-Nieuport 10, the L.N.10-01, first flew at Saint-Nazaire on 21 July 1939. However, on 10 December 1939, the programme was cancelled as the French Navy had decided to use land based aircraft instead, with no production following of either the LN.10 or its competitors.  It was destroyed at Bordeaux in June 1940 to prevent capture by German troops.

The fuselage of the Loire-Nieuport 10 was used for the SNCAO 700 four-engined bomber prototype, of which a prototype was built but failed to fly due to the Armistice.

Specifications

See also

References

 Green, William. War Planes of the Second World War: Volume Six, Floatplanes. London:Macdonald, 1962.
 Green, William. War Planes of the Second World War: Volume Seven, Bombers and Reconnaissance Aircraft. London:Macdonald, 1967.

External links

 Aviafrance

1930s French military reconnaissance aircraft
Floatplanes
Inverted gull-wing aircraft
LN.010
Aircraft first flown in 1939
Twin piston-engined tractor aircraft